[[File:Aquavit Schweden.jpg|thumb|A bottle of "O.P. Anderson", a Swedish akvavit' ']]Akvavit or aquavit (also akevitt in Norwegian; aquavit in English) is a distilled spirit that is principally produced in Scandinavia, where it has been produced since the 15th century. Akvavit is distilled from grain or potatoes, and is flavoured with a variety of herbs. It is also popular in Northern Germany.Akvavit gets its distinctive flavour from spices and herbs, and the dominant flavour must (according to the European Union) come from a distillate of caraway and/or dill seed. It typically contains 40% alcohol by volume or 80 proof (U.S.) The EU has established a minimum of 37.5% ABV for akvavit to be named as such.

Etymology
The word aquavit derives from the Latin aqua vitae, "water of life." Compare the words whisky or whiskey, from Gaelic uisce beatha, which has the same meaning. Likewise, clear fruit brandy is called eau de vie (French for "water of life").

Drinking culture
Akvavit is an important part of Nordic drinking culture, where it is often drunk during festive gatherings, such as Christmas dinners and the Midsummer celebration, and as an aperitif. In Iceland, Sweden, Denmark and Germany aquavit is chilled and often drunk in a single gulp from a small shot glass. This is usually attributed to tradition. It is not generally chilled in Norway, but enjoyed slowly. In Sweden commonly the aquavit is consumed immediately following a song, called a snapsvisa. The most well-known song is "Helan Går". In Finland and Sweden, aquavit consumed from a shot glass is also commonly associated with crayfish parties, which are traditionally held during late August. In Denmark aquavit is called snaps or akvavit, and is primarily consumed in December during Christmas lunches or around Easter during Easter lunches. It is consumed year round though, mainly for lunches of traditional Danish dishes where beer is also always on the table. In Norway, where most aquavit is matured in oak casks, the drink is served at room temperature in tulip-shaped glasses. Aquavit arguably complements beer well, and its consumption is very often preceded by a swig of beer.

Production
Akvavit must be distilled from an agricultural base, most commonly  grain or potatoes. Similarly to gin it is flavored with botanicals.  The dominant flavors must be caraway or dill, sometimes both. Swedish Akvavit must also contain fennel in order to be labeled as such. Other common botanicals include: cardamom, cumin, anise, coriander.
The Danish distillery Aalborg makes an akvavit distilled with amber which imparts a pine-like citrusy note. The Aalborg brand is now produced in Norway by Arcus Group.

The recipes and flavours differ between brands, with each brand's unique characteristics coming from distillation methods and supporting botanicals in their blends. Un-aged Akvavit is clear while aged Akvavit typically has a pale straw to golden hue depending on how long it has been aged in oak casks (most common in Norway) or the amount of colorant used. Normally, a darker color suggests a higher age or the use of young casks, though artificial caramel colouring and infusing fruits or botanicals for color and flavor is permitted before bottling. Clear akvavit is often called taffel, meaning table aquavit. Taffel aquavit is typically aged in old casks that do not colour the finished spirit or it is not aged at all.

Origin and traditional variants

The earliest known reference to "aquavit" is found in a 1531 letter from the Danish Lord of Bergenshus castle, Eske Bille to Olav Engelbrektsson, the last Roman Catholic Archbishop of Norway. The letter, dated April 13, accompanying a package, offers the archbishop "some water which is called Aqua Vite and is a help for all sort of illness which a man can have both internally and externally".

While this claim for the medicinal properties of the drink may be rather inflated, aquavit is popularly believed to ease the digestion of rich foods. In Denmark, it is traditionally associated with Christmas and Easter lunches. In Norway, it is drunk at celebrations, particularly Christmas, Easter or May 17 (Norwegian Constitution Day). In Sweden, it is a staple of the traditional midsummer celebrations dinner, usually drunk while singing one of many drinking songs. It is usually drunk as snaps during meals, especially during the appetizer course – along with pickled herring, crayfish, lutefisk or smoked fish. In this regard, it is popularly quipped that aquavit helps the fish swim down to the stomach.

It is also a regular on the traditional Norwegian Christmas meals, including roasted rib of pork and rib of lamb (pinnekjøtt). The spices and the alcohol are said to help digest the meal, which is very rich in fat.

Among the most important brands are Løiten, Lysholm, Opland and Simers from Norway, Aalborg and Brøndum from Denmark and O.P. Anderson from Sweden. While the Danish and Swedish variants are normally very light in colour, most of the Norwegian brands are matured in oak casks for at least six months, and for some brands even as long as 12 years, making them generally darker in colour. While members of all three nations can be found to claim that "their" style of aquavit is the best as a matter of national pride, Norwegian akevitt tend to have, if not the most distinctive character, then at least the most overpowering flavour and deepest colour due to the aging process.

Peculiar to the Norwegian tradition are Linje Aquavits (such as "Løiten Linie" and "Lysholm Linie"). Linje Aquavit is named after the tradition of sending oak barrels of aquavit with ships from Norway to Australia and back again, thereby passing the equator ("linje") twice before being bottled. The constant movement, high humidity and fluctuating temperature cause the spirit to extract more flavour and contributes to accelerated maturation.

Norwegian aquavit distillers Anora (former Arcus) has carried out a test where they tried to emulate the rocking of the casks aboard the "Linje" ships while the oak barrels were subjected to the weather elements as they would aboard a ship. The finished product was, according to Anora, far from the taste that a proper linje aquavit should have.

Therefore, to this day boats loaded with "Linie Aquavit" set sail from Norway to Australia and back again before they are bottled and sold as part of the Norwegian Christmas traditions but also enjoyed all year round.

Outside the Nordic countries
Aquavit was seldom produced outside of the Nordic countries but that began to change dramatically starting around 2010, especially in the United States, particularly in areas that have a larger concentrations of people with Nordic heritage. An exception, however, is Northern Germany, and in particular the German state of Schleswig-Holstein, which was part of Denmark until the 19th century (see: History of Schleswig-Holstein) and still has a notable Danish minority. Among the most important German brands are Bommerlunder from Flensburg, Kieler Sprotte from Kiel and Malteserkreuz. The latter brand has been produced in Berlin since 1924 by a subsidiary of Sweden's Vin & Sprit AB (now Pernod Ricard), the producer of many Swedish akvavits, and can be considered a German imitation of the Nordic aquavits, since it is based on an original Danish recipe. Brands from Schleswig-Holstein, however, often have a long history, comparable to their Nordic counterparts. Bommerlunder, for instance, has been made since 1760. Aquavit is also an important part of the traditional cuisine of Schleswig-Holstein. German aquavit is virtually always distilled from fermented grain, and generally has an alcohol content of 38%  by volume, marginally less than Scandinavian aquavits.

Psychopomp Microdistillery in Bristol, England, started producing an aquavit (termed 'Aqvavit' due to EU regulations) in 2017. In Canada aquavit is produced by Crosscut Distillery Sudbury, Confluence Distillery, Okanagan Spirits Craft Distillery, Island Spirits Distillery, Long Table Distillery, Spirit of York Distillery Co. in Toronto, Ontario, Newfoundland Distillery Co. in Clarke’s Beach, Newfoundland, Compass Distillers in Halifax, Nova Scotia and Sheringham Distillery on Vancouver Island, British Columbia. Many distilleries in the United States produce aquavit, especially in parts of the country with high populations of people of Nordic heritage. Examples include:  Colorado, Minnesota, Michigan, Wisconsin, Montana, Illinois, Oregon, New Hampshire and Washington. The Midwest States in particular do quite well for the category and have produced numerous internationally acclaimed /award-winning brands.  
See List of Akvavit Producers in the United States for brand names and distilleries.

Spellings

 Danish: Akvavit, Snaps, Brændevin or Dram Norwegian: Akevitt, Brennevin or Dram Swedish: Akvavit, or Kryddat brännvin Dutch: Aquavit English: Aquavit or Akvavit Faroese: Akvavitt Estonian: Akvaviit Finnish: Akvaviitti French: Aquavit German: Aquavit, Kö(ö)m Icelandic: Ákavíti Italian:  Acquavite Polish: Okowita Portuguese: Aquavit Ukraine: Оковита''

See also

 Brännvin, a more general term that includes unflavoured brands
 Poitín, an Irish distilled spirit occupying a similar place in the culture

References

External links
 Norway's message in a bottle
 Rituals: A Pour. A Staredown. A Civilized Bonding.

Danish distilled drinks
Norwegian distilled drinks
Swedish distilled drinks